The Rome General Peace Accords, officially the General Peace Accords, was a peace treaty signed between the government of Mozambique and RENAMO, ending the Mozambican Civil War on October 4, 1992. Negotiations preceding the agreement began in July 1990. They were brokered by a team of four mediators, two members of the Community of Sant'Egidio, Andrea Riccardi and Matteo Zuppi, as well as Bishop Jaime Gonçalves and Italian government representative Mario Raffaelli. The delegation of the Mozambican government was headed by Armando Guebuza, who went on to become President of Mozambique. The RENAMO delegation consisted of Raul Domingos, José de Castro, Vicente Ululu, Agostinho Murrial, João Almirante, José Augusto and Anselmo Victor. The accords were then signed by the then-president of Mozambique Joaquim Chissano, and by the leader of RENAMO, Afonso Dhlakama.

RENAMO declared on October 21, 2013 that they were annulling the peace accord as a result of a government attack on their base.

See also 
 Mozambican Civil War
 Sant'Egidio platform - a January 13, 1995 proclamation of importance to the Algerian Civil War.

Notes

References 

 Eric Morier-Genoud, "Sant’Egidio et la paix. Interviews de Don Matteo Zuppi & Ricardo Cannelli", _LFM. Social sciences & missions_, no.13, October  2003, pp. 119–145
 Pierre Anouilh, "Des pauvres a la paix. Aspects de l'action pacificatrice de Sant'Egidio au Mozambique", _LFM. Social sciences & missions_, no.17, December  2005, pp. 11–40
 Moises Venancio, “Mediation by the Roman Catholic Church in Mozambique 1988-1991”, In Stephen Chan & Vivienne Jabri (eds), _Mediation in Southern Africa_, Basingstoke : Macmillan, 1993, pp. 142–58
 Alex Vines & Ken Wilson, “Churches and the Peace Process in Mozambique 1988-1991”, In Paul Gifford (ed.), _The Christian Churches and the Democratisation of Africa_, Leiden : Brill, 1995, pp. 130–47
Web page of the Community of Sant'Egidio on the Mozambique Peace Process

External links 
Full Text of Rome General peace accord
Text of all peace accords

1992 in Mozambique
Peace treaties
Treaties of Mozambique
Mozambican Civil War
Treaties concluded in 1992